Presidential elections were held in Algeria on 10 December 1976. Incumbent Houari Boumediene, leader of the National Liberation Front (the country's sole legal party), was the only candidate, and was elected unopposed with 99.5% of the vote.

Results

References

Algeria
1976 in Algeria
Presidential elections in Algeria
Single-candidate elections
One-party elections